This is a list of influential and newsworthy people affiliated with Emory University, a private university in Atlanta. The list includes professors, staff, graduates, and former students belonging to one of Emory's two undergraduate or seven graduate schools.

Alumni

Pulitzer Prize
Ellen Gabler (BA 2003) – investigative reporter for the New York Times; member of a team awarded the 2018 Pulitzer Prize for Public Service
Louis R. Harlan (BA 1943) – American historian and academic, winner of the Pulitzer Prize in 1984
Frank Main (BA 1986) – Pulitzer Prize-winning (2011) reporter for the Chicago Sun Times
Dumas Malone (BA 1910) – 1975 Pulitzer Prize-winning historian, former head of Harvard University Press and Presidential Medal of Freedom recipient
David M. Potter (BA 1931) – Southern historian and Pulitzer Prize winner (1977)
Claude Sitton (BA 1943) – Pulitzer Prize winner (1983) and former New York Times national editor
C. Vann Woodward (BA 1930) – 1982 Pulitzer Prize-winning historian

Academia

Presidents of academic institutions
Philip A. Amerson (PhD 1976) – President of Garrett-Evangelical Theological Seminary
Ivan Loveridge Bennett (BA 1943, MD 1946) – physician, dean of the NYU School of Medicine, president of New York University 1980–1981
Robert G. Bottoms (BD 1969) – former president of DePauw University
Marion L. Brittain (BA 1886) – academic administrator, president of the Georgia Institute of Technology 1922–1944
Charles Paul Conn (MA, PhD) – president of Lee University in Cleveland, Tennessee
James H. Daughdrill, Jr. (BA 1956) – 18th president of Rhodes College
Arthur Hollis Edens (BA 1928, MA 1938) – 3rd president of Duke University 
Andrew D. Holt (BA 1927) – 16th president of the University of Tennessee
Isaac Stiles Hopkins (Bachelor's degree 1859) – first president of the Georgia Institute of Technology
Robert Stewart Hyer (BA 1881, MA 1882) – president of Southwestern University, first president of Southern Methodist University, educator and researcher in Texas, noted for experimenting with early X-ray and telegraphy equipment
James F. Jones (Master's degree) – 21st president of Trinity College, Hartford, Connecticut
Howard Lamar (BA 1945) – former dean of Yale College and former president of Yale University
Michael Lomax (PhD 1984) – President and Chief Executive Officer of the United Negro College Fund, former president of Dillard University (1997–2004)
Ward B. Pafford (BA) – 3rd president of the University of West Georgia 
John M. Palms – President of the University of South Carolina, 1991–2002 
Luis M. Proenza – 15th president of the University of Akron 
Luther Martin Smith (BA 1848) – first president of Emory University who also was an alumnus (1867–1871)
Henry King Stanford (BA) – 19th president of the University of Georgia and 3rd president of the University of Miami
G. Gabrielle Starr (BA 1993, MA 1993) – president of Pomona College in Claremont, California
Robert M. Strozier – former president of Florida State University
Frederick Palmer Whiddon (PhD 1963) – founder and first president of the University of South Alabama

Professors
Amalia Amaki (MA, PhD) – artist, art historian
Randall Auxier (PhD 1992) – professor of philosophy at Southern Illinois University
Jim Chen (BA, MA) – Dean of the University of Louisville, Louis D. Brandeis School of Law
Don H. Compier (PhD 1992) – founding dean of the Community of Christ Seminary, Graceland University
Cherry Logan Emerson (BA 1938, MA 1939) – Cherry L. Emerson Center for Scientific Computation founder and distinguished faculty member
Etta Falconer (PhD 1969) – educator and mathematician, one of the first female African-American PhDs in math
Elizabeth Price Foley (BA 1987) – legal theorist
Ted Gayer (BA 1992) – economist, associate professor at Georgetown Public Policy Institute
Margot Gayle (MS Bacteriology) – former American historic preservationist and author
Lassie Goodbread-Black (MA 1944) – farmer and educator; in 1925, became the first woman to enroll at the University of Florida
Louis R. Harlan (BA 1943) – historian and academic, winner of the Pulitzer Prize in 1984
Valerie Horsley (PhD 2003) – biologist
William Kelso (PhD 1971) – archaeologist, director of research and interpretation for the Preservation Virginia (APVA) Jamestown Rediscovery project
Ben Konop (BA) – Lucas County Commissioner, an attorney and law professor at Ohio Northern University, Pettit College of Law and the University of Toledo College of Law
Amy Malek (BA 2003) –  professor, scholar, and sociocultural anthropologist; department chair and director at Oklahoma State University, Stillwater.
Magali Cornier Michael (MA, PhD) – feminist literary scholar, Professor of English, and current chair of the English Department at Duquesne University
Jacob Mincer (BA 1950) – "father" of labor economics and Chicago School member
Howard W. Odum (BA 1904) – sociologist
Susan Pharr (BA 1966) – academic in the field of political science, Japanologist
Elaine Reese (PhD) - academic psychologist, focuses on early language acquisition.
James I. Robertson, Jr. (MA 1956, PhD 1959) – scholar on the American Civil War, professor at Virginia Tech
Jeffrey Burton Russell (PhD) – an American historian and religious studies scholar
Barton C. Shaw (PhD) – historian, professor at Cedar Crest College
Christopher Snyder (MA, PhD) – professor of European history and director of the National Celtic Heritage Center at Marymount University
Melissa Wade (BA 1972, MA 1976, M.T.S. 1996, Th. M 2000) – debate coach and leader in the Urban debate league movement, director of Forensics and the Barkley Forum at Emory University
Judson C. "Jake" Ward Jr. (BA 1933) – Dean of Emory College, later received the Award of Honor of the Association of Emory Alumni, Thomas Jefferson Award, and the Freedom Foundation Award
Sean Wempe (PhD 2015) – assistant professor of history, California State University, Bakersfield; author of Revenants of the German Empire. Colonial Germans, Imperialism, and the League of Nations and Chronic Disparities: Public Health in Historical Perspective
Enoch Marvin Banks (BA 1897, MA 1900) – academic historian at the University of Florida

Business
Nelson Adams (internship 1979 and residency 1982) – physician, President of the National Medical Association, founder and president of Access Health Solutions, LLC
Paul S. Amos II (MBA) – President and CEO of Aflac
Michael Blum – President and CEO of Orix USA Asset Management LLC, global financial services firm with offices in 27 countries and a market capitalization of over $11 billion
Ely Callaway (BA 1940) – founder of Callaway Golf
Mitch Caplan (MBA, JD) – former CEO of E-Trade
John W. Chidsey (MBA, JD) – former CEO of Burger King
Kenneth Cole (BA 1976)) – clothing designer
Harlan Crow – real estate developer from Dallas, Texas
Aaron Davidson – Chairman of the North American Soccer League and President of Traffic Sports USA
Michael Dubin (BA 2001) – CEO of Dollar Shave Club
Marvin Ellison (MBA 2005) – Executive Vice President of U.S. stores, Home Depot
Nir Eyal (BA 2001) – writer, educator, and entrepreneur in the field of consumer psychology and behavioral design
Jason Goldberg (dropped out) – internet entrepreneur
Michael Golden (MBA) – Vice Chairman of The New York Times Company
Michael Golden (MBA) – President and CEO of Smith & Wesson
C. Robert Henrikson (JD 1972) – Chairman of the Board, President, and CEO of Metlife, Inc.
Susan Hoy (Law 1974) – Assistant General Counsel and Assistant Vice President for the Federal Reserve Bank of Atlanta; Emory Law School Distinguished Alumni award recipient in 2008
Charles H. Jenkins, Jr. (BA 1975) – Chairman of Publix Super Markets, Inc.
Alan J. Lacy (MBA 1977) – former chairman and CEO of Sears, Roebuck and Company
Jim Lanzone (JD and MBA) – former CEO of Ask.com, former CEO of Clicker, current CEO of CBS Interactive
Robert A. Maruster (MBA) – executive vice president and chief operating officer of JetBlue Airways
Teri Plummer McClure (Law 1988) – senior vice president and general counsel of United Parcel Service; Emory Law School Distinguished Alumni award recipient in 2008
Raymond W. McDaniel Jr. (JD) – chairman and chief executive officer of Moody's Corporation
Richard H. Neiman (JD) – 43rd Superintendent of Banks for the State of New York
Duncan L. Niederauer (MBA 1985) – CEO, NYSE Euronext
Djuan Rivers (BA 1987) – Vice President of Disney's Animal Kingdom at Walt Disney World
John B. Sams (Advanced Management Program 1988) – Vice President of the Air Force Systems business unit, part of Boeing Integrated Defense Systems
Philip Schwalb (Law 1986) – founder of the Sports Museum of America in New York City
Rankin M. Smith Sr. (attended one year, then transferred to the University of Georgia) – businessman and philanthropist
Jack Stahl (BA 1975) – former president and CEO of Revlon, former president and COO of Coca-Cola
A.J. Steigman (BBA 2008) - Founder and CEO of Steignet
Ben J. Tarbutton (BA 1905) – businessman and politician
Emory Williams, Sr. (BA 1932) – retired corporate executive of Sears Roebuck and civic leader in Chicago, namesake of the "Emory Williams Teaching Award" at Emory University
Robert W. Woodruff (one term as an undergraduate) – former president of the Coca-Cola Company, gave over $230 million to Emory University, namesake of its Woodruff Health Sciences Center and the Robert W. Woodruff Library

Arts and letters

Film and television
Orny Adams (BA 1993) – actor, comedian (Teen Wolf)
Erica Ash (BA) – actress and comedian
Scott Budnick (BA 1999) – film producer (The Hangover)
Fala Chen (BBA 2005) – Chinese-American actress, two-time TVB Anniversary Award for Best Supporting Actress winner, model, and pageant winner
Joel Godard (BA 1960) – television announcer for Late Night with Conan O'Brien
Ernie Harwell (BA 1940) – baseball broadcaster
Glenda Hatchett (JD 1977) – star of the television show Judge Hatchett
Dr. Will Kirby (BS 1995) – celebrity dermatologist, authority on laser tattoo removal, winner of Big Brother and star of Dr. 90210
Justin Lazard (attended) – actor, producer, director, and model
Natalia Livingston (BA 1998) – Emmy Award-winning actress on the soap opera General Hospital
George Page (BA 1957) – television host, known for his work on the PBS series Nature
Adam Richman (BA 1996) – actor, host of Man v. Food on the Travel Channel
Jim Sarbh (BA 2009) – actor in the Hindi film industry
Stephen Schneider (BA) – actor (Broad City)
Eugene Williams, Jr. (BA 1991) – former child actor, known for Fruit of the Loom commercials; author, educator, motivational speaker
Antonia Gentry (BA 2019) – actress, star of the Netflix Original Ginny and Georgia

Journalism and non-fiction writing
David Brinkley – journalist and television newscaster
Doug DeMuro – automotive journalist for Jalopnik and later editor at Autotrader Oversteer
Adam Feuerstein – columnist and journalist in biotechnology sector
Laura Foreman (BA 1965) – journalist and the first woman political writer at The Philadelphia Inquirer.
Charles Haynes – Director of the Religious Freedom Education Project at the Newseum in Washington, DC and senior scholar at the First Amendment Center
Michelle Ye Hee Lee - journalist, The Washington Post
Frank Main (BA 1986) – Pulitzer Prize-winning (2011) reporter for the Chicago Sun Times
Eleanor Randolph – journalist, The New York Times
Kai Ryssdal (BA 1985) – host of Marketplace, a business program that airs weekdays on U.S. public radio stations affiliated with American Public Media
Mike Sager (BA 1978) – bestselling author and award-winning journalist
Jonathan Schanzer – author and scholar in Middle Eastern studies
Bill Sharpe – Charleston, South Carolina news anchor
Claude Sitton (BA 1943) – Pulitzer Prize winner (1983) and former New York Times national editor
Touré (attended) – novelist, journalist, cultural critic

Literature and poetry
H. Jackson Brown, Jr. (BA 1963) – author best known for his book Life's Little Instruction Book
Nicole Cooley (PhD) – poet
Alfred Corn (BA 1965) – poet and essayist
Elizabeth Otis Dannelly (1838–1896) – poet
Norman Finkelstein (PhD) – poet and literary critic
Ken Grimwood (attended 1961–1963) – novelist, author of prize-winning novel Replay, set at Emory
Olga Grushin (BA 1993) – novelist
Lauren Gunderson (BA 2004) – playwright
Carl Hiaasen (attended for two years, then transferred to the University of Florida) – author
Edward E. Kramer (MD) – editor and author of numerous science fiction, fantasy, and horror works
Ferrol A. Sams Jr. (MD 1949) – humorist and best-selling author of Run with the Horsemen
William Y. Thompson (BA 1946) – historian, author of Robert Toombs of Georgia (1966)
Daniel Wallace (attended as undergraduate, and transferred to University of North Carolina, Chapel Hill) – author of Big Fish: A Novel of Mythic Proportions, later made into the Tim Burton film Big Fish

Music
Peter Buck – lead guitarist, R.E.M. (dropped out)
Kristian Bush (BA 1992) – singer and co-founder of the band Sugarland, which won a Grammy Award in 2008
Scooter Braun (attended as undergrad alum) – music manager of Justin Bieber and Ariana Grande
Mac Davis (attended) – country musician, songwriter and actor
Tinsley Ellis (BA 1979) – blues singer
Keri Hilson (attended) – songwriter and R&B artist
Amy Ray (BA 1986) – singer, the Indigo Girls
Emily Saliers (BA 1985) – singer, the Indigo Girls
Robert Schneider (graduate student) – lead singer, guitarist and producer, The Apples in Stereo

Visual art
Julien Binford – painter
Jane Jackson (Davis) (BA 1979) – photography curator, former art dealer, founding director of The Sir Elton John Photography Collection, editor of Chorus of Light: Photographs from The Sir Elton John Collection
Steven Newsome – arts administrator

Other
Christopher McCandless (BA 1990) – subject of Into the Wild by Jon Krakauer
Trip Payne (BA 1990) – puzzle constructor and three-time American Crossword Puzzle Tournament champion
Joshua Schwadron – featured in the March 2003 publication of GQ magazine, which honored him as its national college "Big Man on Campus"

Politics
Note: individuals who belong in multiple sections appear in the most relevant section.

Heads of state
Lado Gurgenidze (MBA 1993) – 6th Prime Minister of the country of Georgia
Lee Hong-koo (BA 1959) – 26th Prime Minister of South Korea

U.S. Vice Presidents
Alben W. Barkley (BA 1900) – 35th United States Vice President

U.S. Cabinet Secretaries and other prominent federal government officials
Robb LaKritz (JD, 1997) – former advisor to the Deputy U.S. Treasury Secretary, appointed by President George W. Bush
Jonathan Levy (BA 2004) – clean energy executive, former Congressional staffer and Obama Administration official, including Deputy Chief of Staff to U.S. Energy Secretary Ernest Moniz
Jody Powell (PhD) – White House Press Secretary under Jimmy Carter
David Poythress (BA 1964, JD 1967) – former Secretary of State and Commissioner of Labor of the state of Georgia

U.S. Governors and Lieutenant Governors
C. Farris Bryant (attended) – 34th Governor of Florida
Bill Haslam (BA 1980) – 49th Governor of Tennessee; heir to the Pilot Flying J fortune; richest Emory alum, worth $2 billion
Crissy Haslam (BBA 1980) – First Lady of Tennessee
Spessard Holland (BA 1912) – 28th Governor of Florida and US Senator from Florida 
Claude R. Kirk Jr. (BS 1945) – 36th Governor of Florida 
Zell Miller (attended) – 79th Governor of Georgia and Senator from Georgia
Mark Fletcher Taylor (BA 1979) – former lieutenant governor of the U.S. state of Georgia
Melvin E. Thompson (BA 1926) – 71st Governor of Georgia

Legislators

U.S. Senators
Nathan Philemon Bryan (BA 1893) – former U.S. Senator from Florida
William James Bryan (BA 1896) – former U.S. Senator from Florida
Wyche Fowler (JD 1969) – former U.S. Senator from Georgia and ambassador
Carte Goodwin (JD 1999) – politician and attorney who briefly served as junior United States senator from West Virginia
George LeMieux (BA 1991) – U.S. Senator from Florida
Thomas M. Norwood (BA 1850) – U.S. Senator and Representative from Georgia
Sam Nunn (BA 1960, LLB 1962) – former U.S. Senator from Georgia
Tom Stewart (attended) – former U.S. Senator from Tennessee

U.S. Representatives
Sanford Bishop (JD 1971) – United States Representative from Georgia and a former Democratic member of the Georgia State Senate
John Glen Browder (MA 1971, PhD 1971) – former member of the United States House of Representatives
Kathy Castor (BA 1988) – U.S. Congresswoman (D-FL)
Max Cleland (MA) – former United States senator from Georgia
Bill Cobey – former U.S. Representative from North Carolina's 4th congressional district; director of the Jesse Helms Center
Tillie K. Fowler (BA 1964, JD 1967) – former United States Representative from Florida
Newt Gingrich (BA 1965) – former Speaker of the United States House of Representatives
Elliott Levitas (BA 1952, JD 1956) – former U.S. Congressman
James MacKay (LLB 1947) – former U.S. Representative from Georgia
Larry McDonald (MD 1957) – politician, member of the United States House of Representatives; victim of Korean Air Lines Flight 007, which was shot down by Soviet Union interceptors
Leslie Jasper Steele (BA 1893) – Congressional Representative for Georgia and lawyer
Fletcher Thompson (BA 1949) – lawyer and Congressional Representative for Georgia
Robert Wexler (attended for undergraduate degree, then transferred to the University of Florida) – Congressman from Florida

State legislators and city officials
Garland T. Byrd (LLB 1948) – former Lieutenant Governor of Georgia
James V. Carmichael (BA 1932) – member of the Georgia General Assembly 1935–1940; candidate for governor of Georgia in 1946
Jeffrey M. Frederick (BA 1997) – former member of the Virginia House of Delegates and former chairman of the Republican Party of Virginia
James A. Harrell, III (Law) – former Democratic member of the North Carolina General Assembly
Chris Kolb (Law) – politician from Ann Arbor, Michigan; former member of the Michigan State House of Representatives
Christian J. Miele (JD 2014) – member of the Maryland House of Delegates
Keiffer J. Mitchell, Jr. (BA 1990) – former member of the Baltimore City Council, member of the Maryland House of Delegates
Joe Negron (JD 1986) – replacement Republican candidate for the Mark Foley Congressional seat in Florida in 2006
Jeff Waldstreicher (BA) – politician from Maryland, member of the Maryland House of Delegates
G. L. P. Wren (Law) – 19th-century member of both houses of the Louisiana State Legislature for Webster Parish
Peter J. Zuckerman – councilman, town of North Hempstead, New York

Mayors
Teresa Tomlinson (JD 1991) – mayor of Columbus, Georgia (2011–2019)

Diplomats
David I. Adelman (JD 1989) – United States Ambassador to Singapore
Gordon Giffin (JD 1974) – 34th Ambassador of the United States to Canada
John Hubert Kelly (BA 1961) – United States diplomat, former United States Ambassador to Finland
Larry Leon Palmer (BA 1970) – United States diplomat, former United States Ambassador to Honduras

Military
Francis L. Garrett – Chief of Chaplains of the U.S. Navy
Kevin M. McCoy (MBA 1994) – 42nd commander of Naval Sea Systems Command
John N. McLaughlin (BA 1941) – Marine Corps Lieutenant General, served in three wars and spent three years as a P.O.W.
Edward L. Thomas – Confederate general during the American Civil War

Judges

U.S. Supreme Court Justices
Lucius Quintus Cincinnatus Lamar (II) (BA 1845) – former United States Supreme Court Justice and Senator from Mississippi

Federal and state judges
Rowland Barnes (BA 1972, faculty member at Emory) – former Atlanta Superior Court Judge
Stanley F. Birch Jr. (JD 1970, LLM 1976) – federal judge on the United States Court of Appeals for the Eleventh Circuit
Elizabeth L. Branch (JD 1994) – federal judge on the United States Court of Appeals for the Eleventh Circuit
Ada E. Brown (JD 1999) – federal judge on the United States District Court for the Northern District of Texas
Mark Howard Cohen (BA 1976, JD 1979) – federal judge on the United States District Court for the Northern District of Georgia
Clarence Cooper (JD 1967) – federal judge on the United States District Court for the Northern District of Georgia
James Larry Edmondson (BA 1968) – federal judge on the United States Court of Appeals for the Eleventh Circuit
J. Robert Elliott (BA 1930, JD 1934) – former politician, federal judge on the United States District Court for the Middle District of Georgia
Orinda Dale Evans (JD 1968) – federal judge on the United States District Court for the Northern District of Georgia
Steven D. Grimberg (JD 1974) – federal judge on the United States District Court for the Northern District of Georgia
Catharina Haynes (JD 1986) – federal judge on the United States Court of Appeals for the Fifth Circuit
Frank M. Hull (JD 1973) – federal judge on the United States Court of Appeals for the Eleventh Circuit
Willis Hunt (LLB 1954) – federal judge on the United States District Court for the Northern District of Georgia
Hugh Lawson (BA 1963, JD 1964) – federal judge on the United States District Court for the Middle District of Georgia
Julien Xavier Neals (JD 1991) – federal judge on the United States District Court for the District of New Jersey
Leah Ward Sears (JD 1980) – former Chief Justice of the Supreme Court of Georgia; first African-American Chief Justice in the United States
Thomas B. Wells (JD 1973) – judge of the United States Tax Court

Attorneys
John M. Dowd (JD 1965) – trial attorney in the U.S. Department of Justice's Tax and Criminal Divisions; Emory Law School Distinguished Alumni award recipient in 2008
Jimmy Faircloth (Master's in Litigation, 1991) – lawyer in Alexandria-Pineville, Louisiana, former executive counsel to Governor Bobby Jindal
E. Duncan Getchell (BA 1971) – lawyer, former nominee to the United States Court of Appeals for the Fourth Circuit
Thomas Hardeman, Jr. (BA 1945) – politician, lawyer and soldier
Ken Hodges (BA 1988) – former district attorney for Dougherty County, Georgia
John James Jones (BA 1945) – politician and lawyer
Randolph W. Thrower (BA 1934, JD 1936) – partner at Sutherland Asbill & Brennan LLP, namesake of the Randolph W. Thrower Symposium at Emory University School of Law
Fani Willis (JD 1996) – first female District Attorney of Fulton County, Georgia

Activists
Larry Klayman (JD 1977) – founder of Judicial Watch
Ralph E. Reed, Jr. (PhD) – conservative political activist
*Yun Chi-ho (BA) – politician, educator; independence activist in Korea in the early 20th century

Religion

Bishops
Frank Kellogg Allan (BA 1956) – eighth Bishop of the Episcopal Diocese of Atlanta
Arthur James Armstrong (BA ) – Bishop of the United Methodist Church
Sante Uberto Barbieri (MA ) – Bishop of the Methodist Church in Latin America
Robert McGrady Blackburn (BD 1943) – Bishop of the United Methodist Church
John Warren Branscomb – Bishop of the Methodist Church
Warren Akin Candler (BA 1877) – Bishop of the Methodist Episcopal Church, tenth President of Emory University
James Edward Dickey (BA 1891) – Bishop of the Methodist Episcopal Church, South
James L. Duncan (BA 1935)) – Bishop of the Episcopal Church
Larry M. Goodpaster (M.Div. 1973, D.Min. 1982) – Bishop of the United Methodist Church
Paul Hardin, Jr. (M.Div. 1927) – Bishop in the Methodist Church
Nolan Bailey Harmon – Bishop of the Methodist Church and the United Methodist Church
Janice Riggle Huie (D.Div 1989) – Bishop of the United Methodist Church
Earl Gladstone Hunt, Jr. (BD, M.Div. 1946) – President of Emory and Henry College, author and theologian, Bishop of the Methodist Church and the United Methodist Church
Lewis Bevel Jones III (BA 1946, M.Div. 1949) – Bishop of the United Methodist Church
Clay Foster Lee, Jr. (Bachelor of Divinity 1953) – Bishop of the United Methodist Church
Richard Carl Looney – Bishop of the United Methodist Church
Arthur James Moore (attended as undergraduate 1909–1911) – Bishop of the Methodist Episcopal Church, South (MECS), the Methodist Church, and the United Methodist Church
Carl Julian Sanders (BD 1936) – Bishop of the United Methodist Church
Roy Hunter Short – Bishop of the Methodist Church and the United Methodist Church
William Turner Watkins (Ph.B. 1926) – Bishop of the Methodist Episcopal Church, South (MECS) and the Methodist Church
Timothy W. Whitaker (M.Div. 1973) – Bishop of the United Methodist Church
Richard J. Wills, Jr. (M.Div. 1967) – Bishop of the United Methodist Church
John K. Yambasu (M.Theo.) – Bishop of the United Methodist Church for Sierra Leone

Ministers and theologians
Young John Allen (BA 1858) – American Methodist missionary in late Qing Dynasty China
Richard E. Blanchard, Sr. (BD 1949) – gospel songwriter
 Lewis C. Branscomb – Methodist minister
John B. Cobb – process theologian
James A. Dombrowski (BA 1923) – southern white Methodist minister, active in the civil rights movement of the 1950s and 1960s
D. L. Dykes, Jr. (1917–1997) (BA 1942) – pastor of First United Methodist Church in Shreveport, Louisiana, 1955–1984; urged racial moderation during the civil rights movement
William P. Harrison – minister and theologian, Chaplain of the United States House of Representatives
Bernice King (M.Div. and J.D.1990) – daughter of civil rights leader Martin Luther King Jr. and Coretta Scott King
Eugene Marion Klaaren (MA) – historian and professor of religion
Steven Jack Land (M.Div. 1973, PhD 1991) – renewal theologian within the Pentecostal movement
Doug Moseley (M.Div. 1957) – retired United Methodist minister and author who served as a Republican member of the Kentucky State Senate
Kiyoshi Tanimoto (1940) Japanese-born Methodist preacher, survivor of Hiroshima bombing
Donald Wildmon (M.Div. 1965) – ordained United Methodist minister, author, former radio host, and founder and chairman emeritus of the American Family Association and American Family Radio

Science

Medicine
Heidi Blanck (PhD) – epidemiologist and chief at the Centers for Disease Control and Prevention
 Mark Elliott Brecher (BA) - Retired Chief Medical Officer LabCorp, Emeritus Professor University of North Carolina
Lisa Cooper (BA) – public health physician, professor at Johns Hopkins University, recipient of the MacArthur Fellows Program fellowship
Robert DuPont (BA 1958) – national leader in drug abuse prevention, policy and treatment
H. Winter Griffith (MD 1953) – physician who authored 27 popular medical books
TImothy Harlan (BA 1987, MD 1991) –  physician, chef and author
John R. Heller Jr. – director of National Cancer Institute 1948–1960 
Hamilton E. Holmes (MD 1967) – orthopedic physician
Chonnettia Jones – geneticist and developmental biologist; director of insight and analysis at Wellcome Trust
William N. Kelley (BA, MD) – CEO of University of Pennsylvania Health System, Dean of University of Pennsylvania School of Medicine, co-discoverer of Kelley-Seegmiller Syndrome
Michael J. Kuhar – Candler Professor of Neuropharmacology at the Yerkes National Primate Research Center, Emory
Alisha Kramer (MD 2018) – physician and health activist
David Malebranche (MD 1996) – Haitian-American physician working in the field of HIV/AIDS; assistant professor of medicine at Emory University
Arnold J. Mandell – neuroscientist and psychiatrist, founding chairman of the Department of Psychiatry at the University of California, San Diego
J. Michael Millis (BA 1981) – academic and surgeon
Arnall Patz (BA 1943, MD 1945) – ophthalmology researcher and Presidential Medal of Freedom recipient who discovered that oxygen therapy causes blindness in infants
Thomas M. Rivers (BA 1909?) – virologist, headed the National Science Foundation's search for a polio vaccine
Charles H. Roadman II (MD 1973) – 16th United States Air Force Surgeon General
William C. Roberts (MD 1958) – cardiologist and pathologist, first head of pathology for the National Heart, Lung and Blood Institute; executive director of the Baylor Cardiovascular Institute of Baylor University Medical Center
Jane Anne Russell – endocrinologist, biochemistry professor
Aalisha Sahukhan (MPH) –  communicable disease expert, and head of Health Protection at the Ministry of Health and Medical Services in Fiji.
David Sherer – physician, author and inventor
Eugene A. Stead (BS 1928, MD 1932) – medical educator, researcher, and the founder of the physician assistant profession
Edwin Trevathan (MD 1982, MPH 1982) – pediatrician and pediatric neurologist; dean of the School of Public Health at St. Louis University, former director of the Center for Disease Control's National Center on Birth Defects and Developmental Disabilities
 W. Dean Warren – former chairman of the Department of Surgery and president of the American College of Surgeons

Technology
David A. Bray (BS, MS, PhD) – IT chief for the Bioterrorism Program at the Centers for Disease Control and Prevention (2000–2005), senior executive with the Office of the Director of National Intelligence, chief information officer with the Federal Communications Commission
Sonny Carter (BS 1969, MD 1973) – astronaut, physician, and professional soccer player with the Atlanta Chiefs
Robert Simpson (MA 1935) – meteorologist and co-developer of the Saffir-Simpson Hurricane Scale

Sports
Warrick Dunn (MBA 2013) – Pro Bowl NFL running back for the Atlanta Falcons and Tampa Bay Buccaneers
Bobby Jones (attended law school 1926–1927) – professional golfer, founder of the Masters Tournament, namesake of The Robert T. Jones Jr. Scholarship Program at Emory University
Alec Kessler (MD 1999) – basketball player for the University of Georgia and the Miami Heat, orthopedic surgeon
Diana Nyad (did not graduate) – world record long-distance swimmer and ranked squash player
Parson Perryman – professional baseball player
A.J. Steigman (Business School) – chess player
Bob Varsha (Law 1977) – automotive racing broadcaster
Wendy Weinberg – Olympic medalist swimmer
 Andrew Wilson (swimmer) (2017) - 2020 Olympic gold medalist swimmer

Honorary degrees
Tom Brokaw (2005H) – author of The Greatest Generation (1998), Peabody Award (1989) and Presidential Medal of Freedom (2014)
*Kim Dae-Jung (1983H) – 8th president of the Republic of Korea 
Vicente Fox Quesada (2009H) – 55th president of Mexico
Arnold Schwarzenegger (2010H) – Austrian American actor and philanthropist; 38th Governor of California 2003–2011

Faculty

African American studies
Carol Anderson – author of White Rage: The Unspoken Truth of Our Racial Divide
Nathan McCall – journalist and New York Times bestselling author

Business
Benn Konsynski – George S. Craft Distinguished University Professor of Decision & Information Analysis at the Goizueta Business School
Paul Rubin – Samuel Candler Dobbs Professor of Economics and Law
Jagdish Sheth – Charles H. Kellstadt Professor of Marketing at the Goizueta Business School

History
Michael Bellesiles – controversial author of Arming America
Dan T. Carter – historian of the modern South
Elizabeth Fox-Genovese – feminist historian and a primary voice of the conservative women's movement
Eugene Genovese – historian of the American South and American slavery
Jeffrey Lesser – historian of Latin America, Samuel Candler Dobbs Professor and chair of the History Department
Gyanendra Pandey – a founding member of the Subaltern Studies project
Mark Ravina – scholar of early modern (Tokugawa) Japanese history
Kenneth Stein – William E. Schatten Professor of Contemporary Middle Eastern History and Israeli Studies

Journalism
Hank Klibanoff – former Managing Editor of the Atlanta Journal-Constitution, current journalism professor

Law
Harold J. Berman (law professor 1985–retirement) – founder of the American Law Center in Moscow, co-founder of the World Law Institute
 Michael Broyde (born 1964) – law professor
Kathleen Neal Cleaver – activist and senior lecturer
Bruce Frohnen – Associate Professor of Law at Ohio Northern University, Pettit College of Law

Literature
Geoffrey Bennington – literary critic and philosopher, expert on deconstruction
Cathy Caruth – literary critic and founder of trauma studies
Richard Ellmann – Robert Woodruff Professor and preeminent James Joyce scholar
Michael A. Elliott –  Charles Howard Candler Professor of English, 20th President of Amherst College
Mikhail Epstein – S.C. Dobbs Professor of cultural theory and Russian literature
Shoshana Felman – literary critic, commentator on psychoanalysis, and founder of trauma theory
Ha Jin – Chinese-American writer, former Professor of English at Emory; winner of the National Book Award, PEN/Faulkner Award, Flannery O'Connor Award for Short Fiction, Pulitzer Prize finalist
James H. Morey – Professor of English, expert in Middle English
Salman Rushdie – author and literary scholar
Avi Sharon – professor of classics, translator, consultant
Stephen Spender – artist in residence, mid-1980s
Natasha Trethewey – Pulitzer Prize-winning poet, United States Poet Laureate 2012 and Robert W. Woodruff professor of English and Creative Writing

Philosophy
Thomas R. Flynn – Samuel Candler Dobbs Professor of Philosophy
Jean-François Lyotard – late Robert Woodruff Professor and prominent French philosopher

Political science
Alan Abramowitz – Alben W. Barkley Professor of Political Science
Gregory Berns – neuroeconomist and writer
Courtney Brown – Associate Professor of political science and remote viewing practitioner
Jimmy Carter – former President of the United States and University Distinguished Professor since 1982
Marion V. Creekmore Jr. – former Deputy Assistant Secretary of State for International Organizations Affairs, U.S. Ambassador to Sri Lanka and Republic of Maldives
Tenzin Gyatso – fourteenth and current Dalai Lama; named presidential professor of Emory University
Harvey Klehr – Andrew W. Mellon Professor of Politics and History
Tom Price (former professor) – member of United States House of Representatives
Dan Reiter – professor of political science

Medicine
Robert Wayne Alexander – chair of the medical school, 1999
Renato D. Alarcón, Head of the department of Psychiatry
Daniel Brat  –  neuropathologist and academic, Emory professor 1999-2017, currently Magerstadt Professor of Pathology, Feinberg School of Medicine
Doug Bremner – Professor of Psychiatry and Radiology, School of Medicine, author
Sanjay Gupta – Assistant Professor of Neurosurgery at Emory; CNN medical correspondent
Thomas R. Insel – neuroscientist; director of the Yerkes Regional Primate Research Center at Emory 1994–1999; left to become director of the National Institute of Mental Health
Melvin Konner – Samuel Candler Dobbs Professor of Anthropology and Associate Professor of Psychiatry and Neurology
Han Qide (韩启德) – Vice Chairman of the National People's Congress of China; previously with Emory School of medicine 1985–1987 and Woodruff Medal Winner in 2006
Barbara Rothbaum – psychologist and head of the Trauma and Anxiety Recovery Program at Emory
Neil B. Shulman – Associate Professor in the School of Medicine, author, children's book writer, website and movie developer
Eric Sorscher – professor, Center for Cystic Fibrosis and Airways Disease Research

Music
Eric Nelson – Director of Choral Studies; conductor of Emory's 40-voice Concert Choir and its 180-voice University Chorus; 2004 recipient of "Crystal Apple" award for excellence in teaching at Emory

Science and technology
Fereydoon Family – Samuel Candler Dobbs Professor of Physics, Fellow of the American Physical Society
Dennis C. Liotta – Professor of Chemistry and co-inventor of the AIDS drug emtricitabine
Keiji Morokuma – William Henry Emerson Professor of Theoretical Chemistry; Director of the Emerson Center
Ilya Nemenman – Winship Distinguished Research Professor of theoretical physics and biology, Fellow of the American Physical Society
Marion Sewer – pharmacologist known for her work on lipid metabolism and efforts to support underrepresented minorities in science, served as deputy chair of American Society for Biochemistry and Molecular Biology's Minority Affairs Committee

Sociology
Robert Agnew – Samuel Candler Dobbs Professor of Sociology; developer of General Strain Theory
Sam Cherribi – Moroccan-Dutch politician and senior lecturer in sociology at Emory
Frans de Waal – Charles Howard Candler Professor of Primate Behavior, foreign associate of the United States National Academy of Sciences

Religion
Thomas J. J. Altizer (professor 1956–1968) – liberal theologian who postulated in the early 1960s the "death of God"
Merle Black – Asa Griggs Candler Professor of Politics and Government
James W. Fowler – Charles Howard Candler Professor of Theology and Human Development
Deborah Lipstadt – Professor of Modern Jewish and Holocaust Studies; author of Denying the Holocaust: The Growing Assault on Truth and Memory (1994)
Don Saliers – William R. Cannon Distinguished Professor of Theology and Worship
Andrew Sledd – first president of the University of Florida (1905–1909), president of Southern University (1910–1914), first professor of New Testament literature at Candler School of Theology (1914–1939)
Devin J. Stewart – professor of Islamic studies and Middle Eastern studies

Presidents of Emory
Ignatius Alphonso Few, 1836–1839
Augustus Baldwin Longstreet, 1840–1848
George Foster Pierce, 1848 -1854
Alexander Means, 1854–1855
James R. Thomas, 1855–1867
Luther M. Smith (1848C), 1867–1871
Osborn L. Smith (1842C), 1871–1875
Atticus Green Haygood (1859C), 1875–1884
Isaac Stiles Hopkins (1859C), 1884–1888
Warren Akin Candler (1875C), 1888–1898
Charles E. Dowman (1873C), 1898–1902
James Edward Dickey (1891C), 1902–1915
Harvey Warren Cox, 1920–1942
Goodrich C. White (1908C), 1942–1957
S. Walter Martin, 1957–1962
Sanford S. Atwood, 1963–1977
James T. Laney, 1977–1993
Billy E. Frye (1954G, 1956 Ph.D.), 1993–1994
William Chace, 1994–2003
James W. Wagner, 2003–2016
Claire E. Sterk, 2016–2020
Gregory L. Fenves, 2020–present

References
"Emory University," New Georgia Encyclopedia. Retrieved July 1, 2006: http://www.georgiaencyclopedia.org.
Gleason, Jan. "Emory ranked 9th-best national university by U.S. News & World Report magazine" in Emory Report (Atlanta: Emory Report, 1997), Volume 50 No. 1.
Hauk, Gary S. A Legacy of Heart and Mind : Emory since 1836 (Atlanta: Emory University, developed and produced by Bookhouse Group, Inc., 1999).
Young, James Harvey. "A Brief History of Emory University," in Emory College Catalog 2003–2005 (Atlanta: Emory University Office of University Publications, 2003), 9–15.

Notes

Emory University people